Shahrestan or Shahristan may refer to:

Places
Counties of Iran ("Shahrestan" in Persian), second order administrative divisions of Iran
Shahristan District, Afghanistan (alternate spelling: Shahrestan)
Shahrestan, Fasa, Fars Province, Iran
Shahrestan, Khonj, Fars Province, Iran
Shahrestan, Khoshk-e Bijar, Rasht County, Gilan Province
Shahrestan, Sangar, Rasht County, Gilan Province
Shahrestan, Mazandaran, Iran
Shahrestan, Tonekabon, Mazandaran Province, Iran
Shahrestan, Qazvin, Iran
Shahrestan, Tehran, Iran
Shahrestan, West Azerbaijan, Iran
Shahrestan-e Olya, Iran
Shahrestan-e Sofla, Iran

Other
Shahristan (city area)

See also
Shahrestanak (disambiguation)